Luo Jiacheng (born 5 January 1995) is a Chinese footballer who currently plays as a midfielder for Chinese club a Guangdong Red Treasure.

Career statistics

Club

References

1995 births
Living people
Chinese footballers
Association football midfielders
Guangzhou F.C. players
Kunshan F.C. players
China League Two players
Chinese Super League players